The Huon languages are a language family, spoken on the Huon Peninsula of Papua New Guinea, that was classified within the original Trans–New Guinea (TNG) proposal, and William A. Foley considers their TNG identity to be established. They share with the Finisterre languages a small closed class of verbs taking pronominal object prefixes some of which are cognate across both families (Suter 2012), strong morphological evidence that they are related.

Internal structure
Huon and Finisterre, and then the connection between them, were identified by Kenneth McElhanon (1967, 1970). They are clearly valid language families. Huon contains two clear branches, Eastern and Western. The Western languages allow more consonants in syllable-final position (p, t, k, m, n, ŋ), while the Eastern languages have neutralized those distinctions to two, the glottal stop (written c) and the velar nasal (McElhanon 1974: 17). Beyond that, classification is based on lexicostatistics, which provides less precise classification results.

 Huon family
 Eastern Huon branch
Huon Tip
Southeast Huon: Kâte, Mape
Sene
Masaweng River: Migabac, Momare
Kovai
Tobo-Kube
Dedua
 Western Huon branch
Burum (Mindik), Borong (Kosorong)
Kinalakna, Kumokio
Mese, Nabak
Komba, Selepet–Timbe
Nomu
Ono
Sialum

Kâte is the local lingua franca.

References

 
 McElhanon, K. A. (1970). Lexicostatistics and the classification of Huon Peninsula languages. Oceania 40: 215-231.
 McElhanon, K. A. (1974). The glottal stop in Kâte. Kivung 7: 16-22.
 Suter, Edgar (2012). Verbs with pronominal object prefixes in Finisterre-Huon languages. In: Harald Hammarström and Wilco van den Heuvel (eds.). History, contact and classification of Papuan languages. [Special Issue 2012 of Language and Linguistics in Melanesia]. 23-58. Port Moresby: Linguistic Society of Papua New Guinea.

 
Languages of Papua New Guinea